Parallel addition may refer to:

 Parallel (operator), a mathematical operation used in electrical engineering
 Parallel addition (computing), a digital circuit performing addition of numbers